Nomia crassipes is a species of bee in the genus Nomia, in the family Halictidae. It occurs in Southeast Asia.

References
 http://animaldiversity.org/accounts/Nomia_crassipes/classification/
 https://www.academia.edu/7390502/AN_UPDATED_CHECKLIST_OF_BEES_OF_SRI_LANKA_WITH_NEW_RECORDS
 http://osuc.biosci.ohio-state.edu/hymDB/nomenclator.name_entry?text_entry=Nomia+crassipes

crassipes
Insects described in 1789